is a city located in Aichi Prefecture, Japan. , the city had an estimated population of 44,581 in 17,691 households, and a population density of 89.3 persons per km².

Geography
Shinshiro is located in east-central Aichi Prefecture. Much of the northern and eastern portion of the city area is covered in mountains and forest, and most is within the borders of the Aichi Kōgen Quasi-National Park

Climate
The city has a climate characterized by hot and humid summers, and relatively mild winters (Köppen climate classification Cfa).

Demographics
Per Japanese census data, the population of Shinshiro has started to decline rapidly over the past 20 years.

Neighboring municipalities
Aichi Prefecture
Toyohashi
Okazaki
Toyokawa
Toyota
Kitashitara District, Tōei
Kitashitara District, Shitara
Shizuoka Prefecture
Hamamatsu（Kita-ku, Tenryū-ku）

History

Middle Ages
The area of present-day Shinshiro was part of the territories of the Okudaira clan, the predecessors of the Matsudaira clan and Tokugawa clan during the Sengoku period.
Their stronghold, Nagashino Castle in what is now the northern part of Shinshiro, was the site of the Battle of Nagashino, between the forces of Oda Nobunaga and the Takeda clan.
Noda Castle, at which Takeda Shingen was wounded at the Siege of Noda was also located within the borders of Shinshiro.

Early modern period
During the Edo period, most of the area was tenryō territory ruled directly by the Tokugawa shogunate through hatamoto administrators.

Late modern period
After the start of the Meiji period, Shinshiro Town in Minamishitara District, Aichi Prefecture was proclaimed on 1 October 1889 with the establishment of the modern municipalities system.

Contemporary history
The area of the town expanded through annexation of neighboring villages in 1955 and 1956.
The city of Shinshiro was proclaimed on 1 November 1958.

On 1 October 2005, the town of Hōrai, and the village of Tsukude (both from Minamishitara District) were merged into Shinshiro.
The city of Shinshiro now covers all of former Minamishitara District.

Government

Shinshiro has a mayor-council form of government with a directly elected mayor and a unicameral city legislature of 18 members. The city contributes one member to the Aichi Prefectural Assembly.  In terms of national politics, the city is part of Aichi District 14 of the lower house of the Diet of Japan.

Economy

Primary sector of the economy

Agriculture
Shinshiro is a regional commercial center, with the economy concentrated on agriculture, especially chicken farming, and light manufacturing.

Education

University
Aichi Shinshiro Otani University
now closed

Schools
Shinshiro has 13 public elementary schools and six public junior high schools operated by the city government, and one public high school operated by the Aichi Prefectural Board of Education. There is also one private high school.

Transportation

Railways

Conventional lines
Central Japan Railway Company
Iida Line：-  -  -  -  -  -  -  -  -  -  -  -  -  -  -  -

Roads

Expressways
 Tōmei Expressway
 New Tōmei Expressway

Japan National Route

External relations

Twin towns – Sister cities

International
Neuchatel, Switzerland  
New Castle, Pennsylvania, United States (since  12 November 1998)
Newcastle upon Tyne, England

National
Taketoyo（Aichi Prefecture, Chūbu region）
since 1984

World New Castle summit
Shinshiro was part of the 1998 summit of worldwide cities named "New Castle" with:

Local attractions
Site of Nagashino Castle
Site of Noda Castle
Mount Hōraiji
Hōraisan Tōshō-gū shrine
Sakurabuchi Park
Yuya Onsen
Atera Seven Falls
Narusawa Waterfall
Thousand Rice Paddies of Yotsuya (Yotsuya Senmaida)
Fuka-ji

Notable people from Shinshiro
Akihiro Ota, politician

References

External links

  
 Shinshiro City official website 

 
Cities in Aichi Prefecture